Cecil Williams (1909–1979) was an English-South African theatre director and anti-apartheid activist.

In 1999, a film about Williams, The Man Who Drove With Mandela, was released.

Biography

Having previously taught English at a high school (including to the lawyer Sir Sydney Kentridge, also an anti-apartheid activist, who described Williams as "a very inspirational master" who "was always talking about politics"), leaving to become an actor, Williams became a communist activist.
When the communists were debating how to respond to the government's demolition of the Sophiatown suburb of Johannesburg, Williams and Jack Hodgson were among those calling for the protesters to use direct force.
He was a leading member in the establishment of the Congress of Democrats, and when the government declared a state of emergency following the Sharpeville massacre he was incarcerated in Pretoria prison.

Williams had an apartment on one of the upper floors of a Johannesburg apartment building. He allowed this apartment to be used as a meeting place between Nelson Mandela and his wife Winnie Mandela when the former was in hiding.

Williams had befriended a wealthy elderly white woman named Mrs Sharp, who bought him gifts and provided him with money; she gave him a large Austin Westminster car. This car was sometimes used by Mandela, when he was pretending to be a chauffeur.

Arrest

Mandela wanted to travel to Natal in order to meet with Albert Luthuli in order to discuss the ANC's relationship with the Pan-African Congress. He was then based in Lilliesleaf, and set off with Williams in the latter's car; Mandela pretended to be a chauffeur. They visited Durban, where Mandela met with Ismail Meer and his wife Fatima Meer, and then drove to Groutville, where Mandela met with Luthuli. Driving back to Johannesburg on the afternoon of Sunday 5 August, they were overtaken by a police car while passing Howick. The police car, soon followed by two others, flagged Mandela and Williams down; Mandela hid his pistol and notebook between the two front seats. Mandela informed the police that his name was David Motsamai, although they replied that they were aware of his real identity and that he and Williams were under arrest. The police drove the pair to Pietermaritzburg, locking them in separate cells.

Williams was subsequently placed under 12-hour house arrest.

Later life

After his release Williams fled South Africa.  He later lived in Glasgow, where he worked as a theatre director and campaigned with the Glasgow group of the Anti-Apartheid Movement.

Personal life
Williams was gay. Mandela biographer Martin Meredith described Williams as "a debonair figure".

References

Footnotes

Bibliography

External links
Article on South African History website

South African LGBT people
South African communists
1909 births
1979 deaths
Place of birth missing
White South African anti-apartheid activists
Gay men